The Quaker Whaler House is the oldest building in Dartmouth, Nova Scotia (1785).  Built by William Ray, a Quaker and cooper from Nantucket who moved to Dartmouth in 1785-86 as a whaler.  Its materials and construction methods closely resembles Quaker architecture in Nantucket, such as the asymmetrical facade design and stone foundation.  The Quakers settled in Dartmouth for six years (1786-1792) before many of them left for England. The most well-known Quaker was abolitionist Lawrence Hartshorne.

See also 
Lawrence Hartshorne's house
 List of oldest buildings and structures in Halifax, Nova Scotia
 History of the Halifax Regional Municipality
 List of oldest buildings in Canada

References

Buildings and structures in Halifax, Nova Scotia